C11orf52 is an uncharacterized protein that in homo sapiens is encoded by the C11orf52 gene.

Gene

Location 

C11orf52 is located on chromosome 11 at 11q23.1, starting at 111908620 and ending at 112064278. C11orf52 spans 155658 base pairs and is orientated on the positive strand. Gene C11orf52 has a molecular weight of 14kDa and is a protein coding gene of 7,995 bp containing four exons. The coding region is made up of 1,168 bp.

Gene neighborhood 
Genes HSPB2, CRYAB, OLAT, and PPIHP1 neighbor C11orf52 on chromosome 11.

Expression 

C11orf52 is highly expressed in the thyroid, thalmus, pituitary, placenta, and prostate, kidney, heart, and skeletal muscles. However, in estrogen receptor alpha-silenced MCF-7 breast cancer cells, it is expressed at an extremely low level compared to control tissues.

Transcript 
There is only one variant of C11orf52 RNA. The mRNA sequence is 1,140 base pairs long. There is an upstream stop codon located at nucleotides 65 – 67. The 23rd amino acid varies between threonine and arginine.

Protein 
The 123 amino acid chain is a domain of unknown function. It has a molecular weight of 13,9 kDal and a predicted Isoelectric Point of 9.74  C11orf52 is predicted to be targeted to the nucleus. 
  
There are no isoforms of the protein encoded by C11orf52.

Structure

The LYS19-22 region is an external domain of the protein structure.

Homology

Orthologs 
There is only one member of the C11orf52 gene family and no splice isoforms can be found going back to Geospiza fortis - the most distantly related to Homo Sapiens C11orf52 sequence. Gene duplication first occurred approximately 324.5 million years ago in reptiles and birds. There are no paralogs for the C11orf52 gene.

Clinical significance 
Unusual DNA methylation in the C11orf52 gene in some children can be attributed to prenatal smoke exposure.

C11orf52 may also play a role in lung cancer. C11orf52 is expressed in the lungs and has been associated with increased phosphorylation in cell lung cancer tumors. There is evidence that phosphorylation mechanisms exist which enhance proteins and pathways which should have inhibited phosphorylation in order to prevent extreme proliferation. C11orf52 is one gene where the phosphorylation is significantly different between the cancerous cells and normal tissue.

Further reading

References 

Human proteins